Eivind Tangen (born 4 May 1993) is a Norwegian handball player for Skjern Håndbold and the Norwegian national team.

He participated at the 2011 World Men's Handball Championship.

Personal life
He is in relationship with fellow handballer, Stine Skogrand. They have one child together.

References

External links

1993 births
Living people
Norwegian male handball players
Norwegian expatriate sportspeople in Denmark
Sportspeople from Bergen
Expatriate handball players